Adile Ayda (7 March 1912 – 5 October 1992) was the first woman career diplomat of Turkey, but is today better remembered as an Etruscologist. She became interested in Etruscan studies while stationed in Rome as the Minister-Counsellor of the Turkish Embassy, did research on the subject during her stay in Italy and wrote down her findings in a number of books, in Turkish and in French. What is spectacular about her texts on Etruscans and renders them of interest is that she posits the Etruscans as Turkic, a proposition that is as controversial today as it was during her lifetime.

Ayda was also known in Turkey as an outspoken parliamentarian during her stint as a member of the Turkish Senate, which she had joined on appointment, as one of the small number of appointed senators, called "kontenjan senatörü" in Turkish, after her retirement from the Turkish Ministry of Foreign Affairs.

Ayda had an eventful professional life. She left the Ministry of Foreign Affairs soon after she joined it, and taught French literature first at the Ankara then Istanbul universities, penned a number of studies  as an academic, in Turkish and in French, before returning once again to the Ministry.

Biography 
Ayda's personal life was not less eventful. She was born Gadile Sadreyevna Maksudova in Saint Petersburg while her father the Tatar Sadri Maksudi  was a member of the Duma, serving as a representative of the Ittifaq al-Muslimin party, close Kadets. In 1917, her father became the leader of the first state formation in the Idel-Ural since the territory of the Kazan Khanate was occupied by the Russians in 1552. She left Russia during the famine of the 1920s as a small child, when her mother Kamile, the daughter of the gold-mining Ramiev family of Orenburg, took her and her younger sister Naile along to cross the Russo-Finnish border clandestinely. They reunited in Finland with Sadri Maksudov, who himself had left the country dressed as a mujik, after the Bolsheviks had put an end to his government in 1918. The family then spent a year in Germany, where Adile started school; then moved to France where they settled. An invitation by Turkey's founding president Atatürk to her father to come and work in Turkey, and the latter's accepting the invitation, brought about a radical change in Adile's life.

Once in Turkey, Adile became Adile Arsal as her father took on a new surname according to the law. She went on with her education in Istanbul, at a French nuns' school, Lycée Notre Dame de Sion Istanbul, and so continued the French education she had been introduced to in Paris. Raised thus in the French intellectual tradition, Adile became, and remained to the last, a French intellectual at heart, unable to suffer fools. She then attended the law school in Ankara where her father was teaching. She was also a staunch Kemalist throughout her life. Known for her strong personality, she was in fact one of the many formidable women the modernizing efforts of the Turkish Republic would bring to the fore.

Ayda was married twice. Her first marriage, to a physician, was very brief. Her second husband was Reşid Mazhar Ayda (1900–1986), a United States-educated mechanical engineer whom she married in 1942. He was the descendant of an old Ottoman family of Istanbul. The Aydas had two daughters and five grandchildren.

Works 
"L’Influence de Victor Hugo sur Mallarmé." Dialogues. İstanbul, 1953.
Le Drame Intérieur de Mallarmé ou l'Origine des Symboles Mallarméens. İstanbul: La Turquie Moderne, 1955.
Un Diplomate Turc Auprès du Roi-Soleil. İstanbul, 1956.
"Molière et l’Envoyé de la Sublime Porte." Les Divertissements de Cour au XVIIe Siècle. Actes du VIIIe Congrès de l'Association Internationale des Études Françaises, Paris, 3-5 septembre 1956 in Cahiers de l’Association Internationale des Études Françaises, 9 (juin 1957). 103-116.
Yahya Kemal. Kendi Ağzından Fikirleri ve Sanat Görüşleri. Ankara: Ajanstürk Yayınları, 1962.
Les Étrusques Étaient-ils des Turcs? Paris: 1971.
Etrüskler Türk mü idiler? Ankara: Türk Kültürünü Araştırma Enstitüsü Yayınları, 1974.
Yahya Kemal’in Fikir ve Şiir Dünyası. Ankara: Hisar Yayınları, 1979.
Böyle İdiler Yaşarken. Ankara: 1984.
Les Étrusques Étaient des Turcs. Preuves. Ankara: 1985.
Atsız’dan Adile Ayda’ya Mektuplar (derleme). Ankara: 1988.
Türklerin İlk Ataları. Ankara: 1987.
Sadri Maksudi Arsal. Ankara: Kültür Bakanlığı Yayınları Türk Büyükleri Serisi, 1991.
Etrüskler (Tursakalar) Türk idiler. İlmî Deliller. Ankara: 1992.
Садри Максуди Арсал. Перевод (Çeviren) В.Б. Феоновой. Москва: 1996.
Bir Demet Edebiyat. Makaleler. Halil İnalcık’ın önsözü ile. Ankara: Türkiye İş Bankası Kültür Yayınları, 1998.

See also 
 List of Turkish diplomats

References 
İnalcık, Halil. "Âdile Abla." Bir Demet Edebiyat, Adile Ayda. Ankara: Türkiye İş Bankası Kültür Yayınları, 1998. 1-19.
Aygün, Ömer (haz. ve çev.) Stéphane Mallarmé. Profil. İstanbul: Yapı Kredi Yayınları, 2002.
Çaykara, Emine. Tarihçilerin Kutbu: Halil İnalcık Kitabı. Söyleşi. İstanbul: Türkiye İş Bankası Kültür Yayınları, 2005.
Pultar, Gönül. "Batı Avrupa Kültürü ile Türk-Tatar Kültürünün Sentezi: Adile Ayda (1912-1992)" (A Synthesis of Western European Culture and Turco-*Tatar Culture: Adile Ayda, 1912–1992)." Paper delivered at the conference entitled "Cultural Relations Between Turkey and Tatarstan" organized in *September 2005 in Kazan, by the Institute of Turkish Studies (Türkiyat Enstitüsü) of Istanbul University and the Institute of Language and Literature of the Academy of Science of the Republic of Tatarstan. (The conference proceedings volume is in preparation, edited by Osman Sertkaya.)

External links 
 Ayda, Adile. Republic of Turkey Ministry of Culture and Tourism website

1912 births
Tatar people from the Russian Empire
Soviet emigrants to Turkey
Lycée Notre Dame de Sion Istanbul alumni
Ankara University Faculty of Law alumni
Turkish expatriates in France
Turkish expatriates in Italy
Turkish women diplomats
1992 deaths
Soviet expatriates in France
Turkish people of Tatar descent